Located in six cities in France, Institut catholique d'arts et métiers is a Graduate Engineering school created in 1898. It is one of the grandes écoles part of Toulouse Tech.

Its different curricula lead to the following French & European degrees :
 Ingénieur ICAM (ICAM Graduate engineer Masters level program)
 Master of Science & PhD doctorate studies
 Mastères Spécialisés (MS) (Specialized Masters)

Academic activities and industrial applied research are performed mainly in French and English languages. Students from a dozen nationalities participate in the different curricula at ICAM.

Most of the 4,500 graduate engineer students at ICAM live in dedicated residential buildings nearby research labs and metro public transports.

Research at ICAM 
 Energy storage and management
 Industrial co-products and waste recycling
 Innovative materials and treatments
 Structures and Couplings
 Industrial, environmental and societal changes
 Factory 4.0

Notable alumni
 Modou Dia, Senegalese politician and former diplomat ;
 Jean-Marie Vanlerenberghe, French politician.

See also
 List of Jesuit sites

References

External links

 Official website

 

Engineering universities and colleges in France
Education in Lille
Institut catholique d'arts et métiers
Education in Toulouse
Education in Nantes
Vannes
Sénart
Educational institutions established in 1898
1898 establishments in France